The David Dewhurst award is a bronze medal bestowed by Engineers Australia and is the most distinguished accolade within their biomedical engineering discipline. It is named in honour of David John Dewhurst  (1919 - 1996), an outstanding Australian biophysicist and biomedical engineer who performed pioneering work in the area of the cochlear implant.  The award was inaugurated in 1994 as the Eminent Biomedical Engineers Award and its first winner was David Dewhurst. Following his death in 1996 the award’s name was changed to the David Dewhurst Award as a permanent memorial.

Recipients 
 1996 Keith Daniel,  Nucleus Ltd.
 1997 Peter C. Farrell,  ResMed
 1998 George Kossoff, CSIRO
 1999 Richard Kirsner, La Trobe University
 2000 Klaus Schindhelm, University of NSW
 2001 Alex Watson, Premier Biomedical Engineering Pty Ltd
 2002 Barry Seeger
 2003 Laurie Knuckey
 2004 Mark Pearcy
 2005 John Southwell
 2006 John Symonds
 2007 Geoffrey Wickham,  Telectronics
 2009 Andrew Downing, Flinders University 
 2010 Alexander McLean
 2011 Graham Grant
 2012 David Burton, Compumedics
 2013 Nigel Lovell, University of NSW 
 2014 James F. Patrick, University of Melbourne 
 2015 Derek Abbott, University of Adelaide 
 2016 Karen Reynolds, Flinders University
 2017 Walter John Russell, University of Adelaide
 2018 Christopher Bertram, University of Sydney
 2019 Alan Finkel, Office of the Chief Scientist (Australia)
 2020
 2021 Leo Barnes, TUV SUD GmbH

See also

 List of engineering awards
 List of prizes named after people
 List of medicine awards

References

Australian science and technology awards
Engineering awards
Awards established in 1996